The Supreme Order of Caucasians was a group organized in Sacramento, California, in April 1876 whose primary focus was to run the Chinese out of the United States.  It quickly grew to 64 chapters called "camps" statewide with about 5,000 members.

References

 History of California, by A.A. Gray, published 1934 by D.C. Heath and Company

Anti-immigration politics in the United States
Chinese-American history
Anti-Chinese sentiment in the United States
White supremacist groups in the United States
History of racism in California
Organizations established in 1876
1876 establishments in California
White nationalism in California